The Women's 25 km competition of the 2020 European Aquatics Championships was held on 16 May 2021.

Results
The race was held at 9:30.

References

Women's 25 km